Jeoutai Technology, formerly known as the ETTV Antelopes and Kinmen Kaoliang Liquor was a semi-professional basketball team that plays in the Super Basketball League (SBL), the first-tier basketball league in Taiwan. In 2008, Kinmen Kaoliang Liquor took over the team from ETTV and adopted the new team name, it is now officially sponsored by Kinmen Kaoliang Liquor.

SBL regular season records
 2003–2004 season: 5th place
 2004–2005 season: 5th place
 2005–2006 season: 6th place
 2006–2007 season: 5th place
 2007–2008 season: 3rd place
 2008–2009 season: 5th place
 2009–2010 season: 6th place
 2010–2011 season: 7th place
 2011–2012 season: 5th place
 2012–2013 season: 6th place
 2013–2014 season: 6th place
 2014–2015 season: 6th place
 2015–2016 season: 7th place
 2016–2017 season: 6th place
 2017–2018 season: 3rd place
 2018–2019 season: 5th place
 2019–2020 season: 5th place
 2020–2021 season: 4th place
 2021–2022 season: 4th place

List of head coaches

See also
 Kinmen
 List of basketball leagues

References

Basketball teams established in 1997
Basketball teams disestablished in 2022
1997 establishments in Taiwan
2022 disestablishments in Taiwan
Sport in Kaohsiung
 
Defunct basketball teams in Taiwan